Laevilacunaria is a genus of sea snails, marine gastropod mollusks in the family Littorinidae, the winkles or periwinkles.

Species
Species within the genus Laevilacunaria include: 
 Laevilacunaria antarctica (Martens, 1885)
 Laevilacunaria bennetti (Preston, 1916)
Species brought into synonymy
 Laevilacunaria benetti [sic]: synonym of Laevilacunaria bennetti (Preston, 1916)
 Laevilacunaria bransfieldensis (Preston, 1916): synonym of Laevilacunaria antarctica (Martens, 1885)

References

 Engl W. (2012) Shells of Antarctica. Hackenheim: Conchbooks. 402 pp.

Littorinidae